Nemesis ( or Kuen Yuttitum) is a 2020 Thai action thriller film directed and written by Gunparwitt Phuwadolwisid.

Plot
Manop, a young man who has a bright future in both work and love and is about to marry Duangjai. But his future is shattered when Duangjai is raped by her boss Sitichon. This made Manop angry and went to attack Sitichon at the office lead to unexpected events. When Sitichon shot Duangjai to death Manop was seriously injured and woke up to become a defendant in the murder of his wife until he was imprisoned.

After getting out of prison, he meets Karnda a psychiatrist who volunteers to heal his mental illness. But then, over time, she discovered Manop, another person she didn't know who rose up to be a vigilante, demanding justice for society with violence every night. As the night progressed, the violence escalated into bloodshed and lead to the mystery behind all the events.

Cast
Jirayu Thantrakul as Manop/ Shiva
Ramavadi Nakchattri as Karnda
Kiat Kitjaroen as Sitichon
Natathida Damrongwisetphanit as Anchalee/ Aun
Silp Ruchiravanich as Chart
Danai Jarujinda as Police
Mookhapon Posakkabuth as Thanasak
Natthakan Thayutajaruwit as Duangjai
Vutichai Siriprusanun as Lawyer
Piboon Thaihuan as Police at gas station
Thanachat Thuamtumnong as Aun's father

Original soundtrack
"Yu-Titum" (ยุติ-ธรรม; "Justice"), ending theme by Taitosmith

Production & release
Nemesis is a project that has been in the director's mind Gunparwitt Phuwadolwisid for many years but haven't had a chance to build it yet. Until the right timing was filmed and released in 2020 under the production of awarded filmmaker Nonzee Nimibutr. The whole story takes place and ends within 12 hours. Featuring film noir style.

It's the first cinematic performance of the two lead performers Jirayu Thantrakul and Ramavadi Nakchattri, and also a turn for the role of a veteran comedian and TV host Kiat Kitjaroen portraying a bad guy for the first time.

The film premieres at Major Cineplex Ratchayothin on August 12, 2020.

Trivia
Its Thai title Kuen Yuttitum literally translates to "The Night of Justice" but Thai stylized คืนยุติ-ธรรม is a wordplay that may be translated as "The Night ends Justice".

References

External links
 

Thai action films
Thai thriller films
2020 films
Films set in 2011
Films set in 2018
Films set in Bangkok
Films shot in Bangkok
2020 crime drama films
2020 crime action films